The Monasterio de San Pelayo  is a convent for women of the Benedictine order, located in the city of Oviedo, Spain. It is also known as the monastery of the pelayas.

The monastery was founded by King Alfonso II of Asturias (the chaste), and first dedicated to Saint John the Baptist, but later to Saint Pelayo martyr, whose relics were supposedly acquired in 994 by the monastery.

The monastery stands near the Cathedral of Oviedo. Mostly remodeled after the 16th century, losing most of its original romanesque elements, including the church designed in 1590 by Leonardo de la Cajiga.

External links 
Official page of the monastery

Pelayo de Oviedo
Monastery of San Pelayo
San Pelayo